The Chesapeake City Bridge carries Maryland Route 213  across the Chesapeake & Delaware Canal in Chesapeake City, Maryland. There are two undivided traffic lanes and one sidewalk on the east side of the bridge.  The U.S. Army Corps of Engineers began construction on the bridge in 1948 and it was opened to traffic in 1949. An older vertical lift drawbridge was destroyed on July 28, 1942, after being struck by the tanker Franz Klasen. The bridge is identical in appearance to the old St. Georges Bridge in Delaware (they were constructed roughly at the same time) except for the number of lanes.

Vertical lift span

The Chesapeake City vertical lift span was constructed between 1924 and 1928. The bridge carried U.S. Route 213, connecting George Street on the south side of the canal with Lock Street on the north. U.S. Route 213 was diverted to the new bridge, while the surface streets leading to the former bridge site were resigned as Maryland Route 537. This lift bridge itself was a replacement of an earlier wooden swing bridge. The replacement was necessitated by the expansion of the canal in the 1920s.

See also
 
 

 List of crossings of the Chesapeake & Delaware Canal

References

Further reading
 The Day the Ship Knocked the Bridge Down: Where Were You? by Robert Hazel, Rare Harmony Publishing.

Bridges completed in 1928
Chesapeake City, Maryland
Vertical lift bridges in the United States
Bridges completed in 1949
Chesapeake & Delaware Canal
Bridge disasters in the United States
Bridge disasters caused by collision
Tied arch bridges in the United States
Road bridges in Maryland
Transportation disasters in Maryland
1928 establishments in Maryland
Towers in Maryland
Bridges in Cecil County, Maryland